Héctor Luis Mercado (born April 29, 1974) is a former professional baseball pitcher, born in Cataño, Puerto Rico. Mercado played all or parts of four seasons in Major League Baseball, as well as one season in Nippon Professional Baseball in Japan. Mercado was listed at 6' 3" in height, and 235 lb. in weight. Mercado batted and threw left-handed during his baseball career.

Mercado played for the Cincinnati Reds and the Philadelphia Phillies during his major league career. He also played one season in Japan for the Fukuoka Daiei Hawks in 2004. He is currently the pitching coach for the Gulf Coast League Phillies.

Playing career

Bouncing around the minors 
On June 1, 1992, Hector Mercado was drafted by the Houston Astros in the 13th round of the 1992 Major League Baseball draft. Mercado signed with the Astros on June 4. On December 9, 1996, Mercado was again drafted, but this time by the Florida Marlins from the Houston Astros in the 1996 minor league draft. On December 15, 1997, Mercado was drafted by the Philadelphia Phillies from the Florida Marlins in the 1997 rule 5 draft, and on exactly the same day, Mercado was traded by the Phillies to the New York Mets for Mike Welch.

Mercado missed the entire 1998 season due to injury. On August 4, 1999, the New York Mets released Mercado, making him a free agent. Mercado signed with the Cincinnati Reds on December 31.

Major League Baseball career

Debut 
Héctor Mercado made his major league debut on April 4, 2000 with the Cincinnati Reds at the age of 25. On that day, the Milwaukee Brewers were playing against the Cincinnati Reds at Cinergy Field, with 16,761 people attending the game. Mercado was called on to relieve Scott Sullivan in the 9th inning. Mercado allowed one hit, one run, and ended the inning and game with an ERA of 9.00. The Reds lost the game 5–1.

Bouncing around again 
On March 30, 2002, the Cincinnati Reds sent Mercado to the Philadelphia Phillies to complete an earlier deal made on March 28. The Cincinnati Reds sent Hector Mercado to the Philadelphia Phillies for Reggie Taylor. He was granted free agency on September 29, 2003, having played in his final major league game on July 11 of that year.

International baseball 
In 2004, Mercado played one game in Japan for the Fukuoka Daiei Hawks. The next season, Mercado was signed as a free agent with the St. Louis Cardinals, on February 2, 2005, only to be released before the season began. He caught on with the Bridgeport Bluefish of the Atlantic League, and on June 23, 2005, Mercado was purchased from them by the Texas Rangers. On October 15, 2005, Mercado was yet again granted free agency, signing with the Detroit Tigers on January 4, 2006. On July 7, 2006, the Detroit Tigers released Mercado.

In 2007, Mercado returned to the Bluefish, appearing in 33 games. In 2008, he started the season in the Mexican League with the Saraperos de Saltillo. Later that year, he played with the Cariparma Parma of the Italian Baseball League to finish his playing career.

Coaching career 
In 2010, Mercado served as the pitching coach of the Gulf Coast League Astros. In 2011, he was promoted to Kissimmee.

Mercado was named as the pitching coach for the GCL Phillies East for the 2018 season.

See also
 List of Major League Baseball players from Puerto Rico

References

External links

Baseball Almanac
Sports Illustrated
The Baseball Nexus
Baseball America

1974 births
Living people
Bridgeport Bluefish players
Cincinnati Reds players
Charlotte Knights players
Puerto Rican expatriate baseball players in Italy
Puerto Rican expatriate baseball players in Taiwan
Fukuoka Daiei Hawks players
Gulf Coast Astros players
Jackson Generals (Texas League) players
Kissimmee Cobras players
La New Bears players
Louisville RiverBats players
Major League Baseball pitchers
Major League Baseball players from Puerto Rico
Mexican League baseball pitchers
Minor league baseball coaches
Nippon Professional Baseball pitchers
Norfolk Tides players
Oklahoma RedHawks players
Osceola Astros players
Parma Baseball Club players
People from Cataño, Puerto Rico
Philadelphia Phillies players
Portland Sea Dogs players
Puerto Rican expatriate baseball players in Mexico
Puerto Rican expatriate baseball players in Japan
Reading Phillies players
Saraperos de Saltillo players
Scranton/Wilkes-Barre Red Barons players
Toledo Mud Hens players